The Lighthouse is a 2019 film directed and produced by Robert Eggers, from a screenplay he co-wrote with his brother Max Eggers. It stars Willem Dafoe and Robert Pattinson as nineteenth-century wickies (lighthouse keepers) in turmoil after being marooned at a remote New England outpost by a wild storm. The film has defied categorization in media, and interpretations of it range from a horror film, a psychological thriller, a survival film, and a character study, among others.

The idea for the film first emerged from Max Eggers' re-envisioning of Edgar Allan Poe's unfinished short story of the same name. Robert Eggers assisted the development when Max was unable to complete the adaptation of "The Light-House", sourcing the plot from a nineteenth-century legend of an accident at a lighthouse in Wales. The Lighthouse draws visually from photography of 1890s New England, maritime-themed French cinema from the 1930s, and symbolist art. Principal photography took place in Nova Scotia, Canada, beginning in April 2018 and lasting slightly over a month. It was shot in black-and-white, with a nearly-square 1.19:1 aspect ratio.

The film premiered at the Cannes Film Festival on May 19, 2019, and was theatrically released in the United States by A24 on October 18, 2019. It grossed over $18 million, against an $11 million budget, and received widespread critical acclaim, with particular praise for the direction, visuals, and performances of Dafoe and Pattinson. Among its numerous accolades, the film was nominated for Best Cinematography at the 92nd Academy Awards and the 73rd British Academy Film Awards.

Plot

In 1890s New England, Ephraim Winslow arrives on a small, rocky island far off of the coast for his first four-week stint as a "wickie" (lighthouse keeper), under the supervision of the experienced Thomas Wake. Wake, a former sailor, immediately proves to be very demanding, and he has Winslow do such jobs as emptying chamber pots, maintaining the machinery, carrying heavy kerosene tanks up the stairs, and painting the lighthouse, while barring Winslow from the lantern room. Winslow observes that, every night after ascending the lighthouse, Wake removes his clothes before the light.

One evening while dining, Wake reveals to Winslow that his previous assistant perished after losing his sanity. He says he noticed a one-eyed gull bothering Winslow, but tells Winslow not to harm it, as gulls are reincarnated sailors, and killing them brings bad luck. Winslow begins to dream of sea demons and logs floating in the sea. After two weeks on the island, he reveals he was previously a lumberjack in Maine.

The day before the scheduled departure, Winslow discovers a dead gull inside the cistern, bloodying the drinking water. He is attacked by the one-eyed gull and brutally slaughters it, after which the wind changes direction, and a fierce storm hits the island. Winslow and Wake spend the night getting drunk, and the storm prevents the lighthouse tender from collecting them the next day. As Winslow empties the chamber pots, he notices a body washed up on the shore and discovers it is a mermaid, which awakens and screams at him. He flees back to the cottage, where Wake informs him the storm has spoiled their rations, and, when Winslow is not worried because he thinks the tender is only a day late, that they have already been stranded for weeks. The pair unearth a crate at the lighthouse's base that Winslow assumes contains reserve rations, but it is full of bottles of alcohol.

As the storm continues to rage, Winslow and Wake get drunk every night and alternate between moments of intimacy and aggressiveness. Wake curses Winslow when he says he does not like Wake's cooking, Winslow tries to steal the lantern room keys from Wake as he sleeps one day and contemplates murdering him, and Winslow finds the one-eyed head of Wake's previous wickie in a lobster trap. While drunk, Winslow confesses to Wake that his real name is Thomas Howard, and he assumed the identity of Ephraim Winslow, his cruel foreman in Maine who he had watched drown without helping, because Winslow had a clean record. He then has a menacing vision of Wake and runs to the dory to try to leave the island, but Wake appears and destroys the boat with an axe. After chasing Howard back to their lodgings, Wake claims it was Howard who chased him and hacked up the dory, as Howard was driven mad by his confession.

With no alcohol left, Howard and Wake begin drinking a concoction of turpentine and honey, and that night a giant wave crashes through the wall of their cottage. In the morning, Howard finds Wake's logbook, in which Wake has criticized him as a drunken and incompetent employee and recommended he be sacked without pay. He insists he is a hard worker and begs to be let into the lantern room, but Wake refuses and belittles him, so he attacks Wake, who he sees as the real Winslow, the mermaid, and a Proteus-like figure. Howard beats Wake into submission and takes him to the hole at the base of the lighthouse to bury him alive. Wake describes the dangers of looking in the lantern before losing consciousness, and Howard takes the keys to the lantern room.

Howard goes to get a cigarette, and Wake runs in and strikes him in the shoulder with the axe. He disarms Wake and murders him, and then ascends the lighthouse. In the lantern room, the Fresnel lens opens to Howard, who reaches in and bursts into disturbing, deranged screaming, before falling down the lighthouse steps. Sometime later, a barely-alive Howard lies nude on the rocks with a damaged eye as a flock of gulls peck at his exposed organs. The final shot is of the entire island with the lighthouse missing.

Cast
 Robert Pattinson as Ephraim Winslow/Thomas Howard
 Willem Dafoe as Thomas Wake
 Valeriia Karamän as the Mermaid
 Logan Hawkes as the real Ephraim Winslow

Production

Development

The original idea for The Lighthouse was first articulated at a dinner between director Robert Eggers and his younger brother, Max Eggers. Robert was unhappy with his film industry prospects after the pitching of his first major feature, The Witch (2015), failed to secure funding. Max shared the basic outline of his screenplay, a lighthouse-set ghost tale as part of an attempted reimagining of Edgar Allan Poe's unfinished short story "The Light-House". Adapting the short story proved troublesome, halting Max's progress on the script, which, at the time, had the tentative working title Burnt Island. Robert started musing ideas to bolster the project's conceptualization, and, with his brother's support, soon began investigating for source material.

One story that caught the director's attention in his initial research was a nineteenth-century myth of an incident at Smalls Lighthouse in Wales, wherein one of two wickies, both named Thomas, died while trapped at the outpost by a destructive storm. That both men were named Thomas, Robert recalled, compelled him to create a film with an underlying story of identity. Around the time there was a realized concept, Robert temporarily stopped his commitment to The Lighthouse when he found an investor to finance The Witch.

The unexpected success of The Witch elevated Robert's directing profile. To exploit his newfound credibility, he pushed The Lighthouse, among several other projects, in his negotiations with studio executives. He and Max then resumed their work by exchanging and revising drafts. This coincided with more rigorous research of the period to develop the onscreen world, as Robert immersed himself in photos of 1890s New England, 1930s maritime-themed French films, and symbolist art for visual reference.

The Eggers' study of literature with maritime and surrealist themes informed the speech of the characters in The Lighthouse. They looked into the writings of Herman Melville, Robert Louis Stevenson, and H. P. Lovecraft, among others, before coming across the work of Sarah Orne Jewett, a novelist best known for her local color works set around the coast of Maine. Her dialect-heavy writing style provided the cadences of the lead characters in the film, rooted in the experiences of her own sailor characters and real-life farmers, fishermen, and captains she had interviewed. Robert and Max also deferred to a dissertation on Jewett's technique to guide their direction for intense conversational scenes.

Another force shaping The Lighthouse creative direction was the Eggers' theater background. The two men sourced elements from playwrights that influenced their work as young teens, chiefly artists such as Samuel Beckett, Harold Pinter, and Sam Shepard whose writings examine male-centric perspectives of existential crises and psychosis.

Casting

The film stars Willem Dafoe and Robert Pattinson, who both separately approached Robert Eggers to express their enthusiasm for The Witch and their desire to collaborate. Pattinson and Eggers originally met to discuss Pattinson portraying a Victorian socialite in an unrelated project, but Pattinson passed because he believed the role would fail to challenge his acting ability. His next meeting with Eggers took place once he finished reading The Lighthouse completed script, and during the conversation Pattinson showed Eggers a clip of an intoxicated man screaming "I am a demon" to convey this understanding of the director's vision.

Eggers' initial film proposals with Dafoe were also not fruitful. Dafoe and Pattinson had met at a party, and Pattinson's participation in The Lighthouse was used as a selling point in pitches to Dafoe. When they met in person to discuss the project, the director was plainspoken in the conversation. Dafoe recalled: "There was no discussion. 'This is the way we're going to do this. My way or the highway.' That's very unusual, especially for a two-hander, for a director to say, 'This is the way I see it. Yes or no?'"

In February 2018, it was announced that Dafoe, and then Pattinson, had been cast in the film. To prepare for their respective roles, each actor employed different techniques at the rehearsals. Dafoe, citing his theater background with the experimental troupe The Wooster Group, drew from his spontaneous acting style in rehearsals, whereas Pattinson planned his rehearsing from the discussion of the script.

Anya Taylor-Joy, who starred in Eggers' directorial debut The Witch, was eager to work with him again and asked if she could play the mermaid. Eggers replied that there was not a role for her and she "really should not be this particular mermaid". Taylor-Joy then jokingly suggested that she could play a seagull instead.

Filming

Because the filmmakers could not find a lighthouse suitable for the needs of the production, they constructed a 70-foot (20-meter) lighthouse set on Cape Forchu in Lief Erikson Park in Yarmouth County, Nova Scotia. Most of the interiors were filmed on sets constructed inside a hangar at Yarmouth Airport and in soundstages near Halifax. Principal photography began on April 9, 2018, and lasted approximately 35 days, which was slightly over schedule, as a result of unforeseen circumstances on set. Difficulties arose due to the remote location, the harsh climate, and technical caveats of the camerawork.

Eggers had already envisioned shooting The Lighthouse in black-and-white, with a boxy aspect ratio, before drafting of the script. Although he and director of photography Jarin Blaschke, who was working with Eggers for the third time, faced resistance from studio executives hoping to maximize the film's commercial prospects, the two men were adamant and did not want to shoot in color because they feared undermining the artistic integrity of their work. Initially, Eggers wanted to use a 1.33:1 aspect ratio, believing it would sufficiently capture the confined sets and the lighthouse's vertical orientation, but he reconsidered when Blaschke suggested, as a joke, instead using the 1.19:1 aspect ratio that was used fleetingly during the film industry's transition to sound. After further analysis of period films for inspiration, chiefly the German thriller M (1931), Blaschke determined that the 1.19:1 format endowed footage with a greater sense of confinement, while amplifying the physical isolation of the characters in their environment, and the film was shot in that ratio.

The film was shot on 35mm film using Panavision Panaflex Millennium XL2 cameras equipped with vintage Bausch and Lomb Baltar lenses. Occasionally, to capture flashback sequences or scenes of heightened conflict, specialized lenses refurbished by Panavision were used. The onscreen universe was given a highly saturated visual palette evocative of orthochromatic film. Creating the spectrum of textures with a sufficient antique quality was one of Blaschke's initial responsibilities during the pre-production. He developed a process to test the utility of digital footage in color negative film stock, first with Kodak Vision3 500T 5219 film, before selecting Eastman Double-X 5222 stock based on the composition produced. Blaschke resumed the testing after securing the Baltar lenses for the shoot, this time with an arrangement of shortpass filters—a class of scientific optical filters—and photographic filters most sensitive to blue-green and ultraviolet light. The specifications were so unusual that it required the manufacture of custom sets of filters by Schneider Kreuznach, which was a costly, month-long endeavor. Blaschke recalled, "I sketched a desired spectrograph on graph paper, indicating a complete elimination of all light beyond 570 nanometers [mid-yellow] while allowing all shorter wavelengths to pass freely. At that point, I was unsure of the true light loss and I was pretty nervous about it." Post-production editing of The Lighthouse occurred simultaneously at the FotoKem film laboratories in Burbank, California.

Analysis

Genre
The Lighthouse has been described as a horror film by critics such as Manohla Dargis of The New York Times, and as a psychological thriller by critics such as Lee Marshall of Screen Daily. Other critics said it was a film that could not be pigeonholed, with Owen Gleiberman of Variety declaring that "you may feel in your bones that you're watching a supernatural shocker [...] Are we seeing a slice of survival, a horror film, or a study in slow-brewing mutual insanity? How about all of the above?" Michael Phillips of The Chicago Tribune echoed Gleiberman's statements, noting that the film's plot did not operate "as any sort of conventional ghost story, or thriller, or anything".

Psychoanalysis
Eggers said the film's sub-text was influenced by Sigmund Freud, and he hoped that "it's a movie where both Jung and Freud would be furiously eating their popcorn". Given his simultaneous fear and admiration of the senior lighthouse keeper, the younger keeper displays an Oedipal fixation, and Pattinson commented on the father/son dynamic in the film by stating that "I was pretty conscious of how I wanted the relationship to come across. In a lot of ways, he sort of wants a daddy", as well as that, as the film progresses, his character is increasingly "looking for Willem [Dafoe]'s validation" as both a boss and a father-figure. Pattinson also said the phallic imagery of the lighthouse is explicit, with Eggers describing it in the script as an erect penis, and Eggers said the film was meant to include "a very juvenile shot of a lighthouse moving like an erect penis and a match-cut to actual erect penis" belonging to Howard´s character, but this sequence was removed at the request of the financiers. Body double was used to film this scene and when Pattinson was asked about this in interview he said that when he saw that scene he didn´t even know it was a penis and he thought it was a lighthouse

Mythology

There are parts of the film inspired by both sailors' myths and classical mythology. The fate of the younger lighthouse keeper invokes the myth of Prometheus, as, after finally reaching the light and learning what is in it, he falls down the stairs of the lighthouse and his organs are plucked out by seagulls. On the other hand, the older keeper was modeled on Proteus, a "prophecy-telling ocean god who serves Poseidon", as he "makes that uncannily accurate prediction for how Ephraim will die at the end of the movie" and is even seen with tentacles and sea creatures stuck to his body in one of the younger man's hallucinations. Albrecht Dürer's engraving The Sea Monster inspired Wake's appearance, with Eggers saying: "The Proteus figure that is more clearly nautical is somewhat based on a sea monster by Dürer, who carries a tortoise shell shield." Eggers explained the allusions to classical mythology by saying they are present "Partially because Melville goes there and partially because of I'm sure our unhealthy Jungian leanings".

Sexuality

The film contains explicit depictions of male sexuality, and primarily depicts two men alone in close quarters on an island, but, when asked whether the film was "a love story", Robert Eggers replied: 

Sexual fantasy and masturbation are recurring themes in the film. For Dafoe, the androphilia in the film is blatant, but it is also used to explore what it means to be a man: "They have a sense of guilt, of wrong [...] it's got existential roots [...] about masculinity and domination and submission." After beating the older lighthouse keeper into submission, the younger keeper assumes a dominant role, calling the older man "dog" and dragging him on a leash. Commenting on this scene, Pattinson said "there's definitely a take where we were literally trying to pull each other's pants down. It literally almost looked like foreplay."

The mythological and artistic influences of the film underscore its eroticism. Eggers acknowledged the visual influence of symbolist artists Sascha Schneider and Jean Delville, whose "mythic paintings in a homoerotic style become perfect candidates as imagery that's going to work itself into the script." The composition of a shot in the film was consciously adapted from Schneider's Hypnosis.

Release
The Lighthouse had its world premiere on May 19, 2019, in the Directors' Fortnight section of the Cannes Film Festival, and it was screened at the Toronto International Film Festival and the Atlantic Film Festival in September. It was distributed by A24 in North America and by Focus Features internationally, and was released in theaters on October 18, 2019.

Reception

Box office
The film grossed $10.9 million in the United States and $7.5 million in other territories, for a worldwide box-office total of $18.3 million.

Its limited opening weekend in the U.S., the film grossed $419,764 from eight theaters, for an average of $52,471 per venue. Its second weekend, the film expanded to 586 theaters and grossed $3.75 million, placing eighth at the box office. The following weekend, the film expanded to 978 theaters, but its gross fell 34.7% to $2 million, and it finished in 13th place.

Critical response
On review aggregation website Rotten Tomatoes, the film holds an approval rating of 90% based on 392 reviews, with an average score of 8.0/10; the site's "critics consensus" reads: "A gripping story brilliantly filmed and led by a pair of powerhouse performances, The Lighthouse further establishes Robert Eggers as a filmmaker of exceptional talent." On Metacritic, the film has a weighted average score of 83 out of 100 based on 52 critics, indicating "universal acclaim."

Owen Gleiberman of Variety called the film "darkly exciting" and "made with extraordinary skill," commenting that "the movie, building on The Witch, proves that Robert Eggers possesses something more than impeccable genre skill. He has the ability to lock you into the fever of what's happening onscreen." Robbie Collin of The Daily Telegraph gave the film a perfect score, calling Dafoe's performance "astounding" and comparing Pattinson's to that of Daniel Day-Lewis in There Will Be Blood, saying, "that's no comparison to make lightly, but everything about The Lighthouse lands with a crash. It's cinema to make your head and soul ring." Peter Bradshaw of The Guardian, in addition to praising the performances of Dafoe and Pattinson, also praised the screenplay, stating that the "script is barnacled with resemblances to Coleridge, Shakespeare, Melville – and there's also some staggeringly cheeky black-comic riffs and gags and the two of them resemble no-one so much as Wilfrid Brambell and Harry H Corbett: Steptoe and Son in hell." Manohla Dargis of The New York Times praised the character development, production design, acting, and themes, and Michael Phillips of the Chicago Tribune gave the film three stars out of five, comparing it to The Odd Couple (1968) and The Dumb Waiter (1957), and lauding the cinematography.

Conversely, Sandra Hall of The Sydney Morning Herald said the film's attempts at suspense were not successful, and Simran Hans of The Guardian gave it two stars out of five, saying the performances felt more like an "experiment than conducive to eliciting meaning." Mick LaSalle of the San Francisco Chronicle said the film was well-made, but "fails to give us the one thing that might have sustained an audience’s interest over the course of 109 excruciating minutes: a compelling story." Dana Stevens of Slate concluded her review by stating that "The Lighthouse is at its strongest when it resembles the dark comedy of a Beckett play, complete with earthy scatological humor. [...] But as the mythological references pile up and the forbidden light atop the tower accrues ever more (and ever vaguer) symbolic meaning, the film sometimes seems funny [...] not because of but in spite of the filmmakers’ intentions", and that, by the end, she became "impatient" with Eggers' "reliance on atmosphere [...] to take the place of story" and found herself "identifying with the stranded seafarers: I desperately wanted to get out."

Accolades

References

External links
  at A24
 
 Original screenplay by Robert and Max Eggers

2019 films
2019 LGBT-related films
A24 (company) films
American black-and-white films
American horror films
American LGBT-related films
American psychological thriller films
Films about alcoholism
Films about curses
Films about mermaids
Films based on classical mythology
Films directed by Robert Eggers
Films scored by Mark Korven
Films set in the 1890s
Films set in New England
Films set on uninhabited islands
Films shot in Nova Scotia
Focus Features films
Magic realism films
Regency Enterprises films
Two-handers
Works set in lighthouses
English-language Canadian films
American independent films
2019 independent films
2010s English-language films
Canadian horror films
Canadian psychological thriller films
Canadian LGBT-related films
Canadian independent films
LGBT-related horror thriller films
2010s Canadian films
2010s American films